Zhulat is a village in Southern Albania. It is part of the  former Cepo municipality. As part of the 2015 local government reform, it became part of the municipality Gjirokastër. The village is inhabited by Muslim Albanians.

References

Populated places in Gjirokastër
Villages in Gjirokastër County